Re d'Italia (King of Italy) was the lead ship of the  armored frigates built in the United States for the Italian Regia Marina (Royal Navy) in the early 1860s. She was laid down at the William H. Webb Shipyard in New York in November 1861, was launched in April 1863, and was completed a year later in September 1864; the two Re d'Italia-class ships were the only Italian ironclads built in the United States. The ships were broadside ironclads, armed with a battery of six 72-pounder guns and thirty-two  guns.

Re d'Italia initially served as the flagship of the Italian fleet, though she was replaced by the turret ship  shortly before the Battle of Lissa in 1866. During that battle, Re d'Italia was at the center of the melee. After her rudder was disabled by an Austrian vessel, the Austrian flagship,  rammed her and tore a large hole in her hull. Re d'Italia quickly rolled over and sank, taking some 400 of her crew with the ship, including her captain, Emilio Faà di Bruno.

Design

Her hull was built from green wood. She had a crew of 565. 

The ship's propulsion system consisted of one single-expansion marine steam engine that drove a single screw propeller. Steam was supplied by four coal-fired, rectangular fire-tube boilers, which were vented through a single funnel located amidships. For long-distance travel, Re d'Italia was fitted with three masts and was barque-rigged.

Re d'Italia was a broadside ironclad, and she was armed with a main battery of six 72-pounder  guns and thirty-two  rifled muzzle-loading guns. The ship was equipped with a spur-shaped ram at the bow. Her rudder and propellers, however, were not protected by her armor.

Service history
Re d'Italia was built by William H. Webb at his shipyard in New York City. She was laid down on 21 November 1861 and launched on 18 April 1863. The ship arrived in Italy in April 1864 and was commissioned into the Italian fleet on 18 September 1864. Less than two years later, in June 1866, Italy declared war on Austria, as part of the Third Italian War of Independence, which was fought concurrently with the Austro-Prussian War. The Italian fleet commander, Admiral Carlo Pellion di Persano, initially adopted a cautious course of action; he was unwilling to risk battle with the Austrian Navy, despite the fact that the Austrian fleet was much weaker than his own. Persano claimed he was simply waiting on the ironclad ram , en route from Britain, but his inaction weakened morale in the fleet, with many of his subordinates openly accusing him of cowardice.

Rear Admiral Wilhelm von Tegetthoff brought the Austrian fleet to Ancona on June 27, in attempt to draw out the Italians. At the time, many of the Italian ships were in disarray; several ships did not have their entire armament, and several others had problems with their engines. Re d'Italia had a fire burning in her coal bunkers. Persano held a council of war aboard the ironclad  to determine whether he should sortie to engage Tegetthoff, but by that time, the Austrians had withdrawn, making the decision moot. The Minister of the Navy, Agostino Depretis, urged Persano to act and suggested the island of Lissa, to restore Italian confidence after their defeat at the Battle of Custoza the previous month. On 7 July, Persano left Ancona and conducted a sweep into the Adriatic, but encountered no Austrian ships and returned on the 13th.

Battle of Lissa

On 16 July, Persano took the Italian fleet out of Ancona, bound for Lissa, where they arrived on the 18th. With them, they brought troop transports carrying 3,000 soldiers; the Italian warships began bombarding the Austrian forts on the island, with the intention of landing the soldiers once the fortresses had been silenced. In response, the Austrian Navy sent the fleet under Tegetthoff to attack the Italian ships. At that time, Re d'Italia was Persano's flagship in the 2nd Division, along with the ironclad  and the coastal defense ship . After arriving off Lissa on the 18th, Persano sent most of his ships to bombard the town of Vis, but he was unable to effect the landing.

The next morning, Persano ordered another attack; four ironclads would force the harbor defenses at Vis while Re d'Italia and the rest of the fleet would attempt to suppress the outer fortifications. This second attack also proved to be a failure, but Persano decided to make a third attempt the next day. Re d'Italia and the bulk of the fleet would again try to disable the outer forts in preparation for the landing. Before the Italians could begin the attack, the dispatch boat  arrived, bringing news of Tegetthoff's approach. Persano's fleet was in disarray; the three ships of Admiral Giovanni Vacca's 1st Division were three miles to the northeast from Persano's main force, and three other ironclads were further away to the west. Persano immediately ordered his ships to form up with Vacca's, first in line abreast formation, and then in line ahead formation. Re d'Italia was the fourth ship in the Italian line, behind only Vacca's ships.

Shortly before the action began, Persano decided to leave Re d'Italia and transfer to Affondatore, though none of his subordinates on the other ships were aware of the change. They were thus left to fight as individuals without direction. More dangerously, by stopping Re d'Italia, he allowed a significant gap to open up between Vacca's three ships and the rest of the fleet. Tegetthoff took his fleet through the gap between Vacca's and Persano's ships, though he failed to ram any Italian vessels on the first pass. The Austrians then turned back toward Persano's ships, and took Re d'Italia, San Martino, and Palestro under heavy fire. The Austrian ships concentrated their fire on Re d'Italia, paying particular attention to her stern. In their attempts to ram her, one of the Austrian ships destroyed Re d'Italias rudder, leaving her unmaneuverable.

Re d'Italias captain, Emilio Faà di Bruno, attempted to escape from the melee, but he could only steer his ship using her engines. Blocked by another Austrian ironclad, Faà di Bruno ordered his ship to reverse course. She was almost stopped when she was rammed by the Austrian flagship, . The Austrian ship's ram tore a gaping hole in Re d'Italias hull. She quickly rolled over to port and sank. Out of her crew, only 166 men were saved; the remaining 400 went down with the ship, including Faà di Bruno.

Notes

References

Further reading

External links
 Re d'Italia Marina Militare website 

1863 ships
Ships built by William H. Webb
Re d'Italia class ironclad
Maritime incidents in July 1866
Shipwrecks in the Adriatic Sea